The Countess of Salisbury is a 1767 tragedy by Hall Hartson. It is inspired by the 1762 novel Longsword by Irish writer Thomas Leland, who had been Hartson's tutor. It is based on the life of William Longespée, 3rd Earl of Salisbury, son of Henry II of England, and his wife Ela of Salisbury, 3rd Countess of Salisbury.

The original Haymarket cast included Spranger Barry as Alwin, Thomas Barry as Raymond, Ann Dancer as Countess, John Sowdon as Grey, John Palmer as Morton and John Bannister as Sir Ardolf.

References

Bibliography
 Baines, Paul & Ferarro, Julian & Rogers, Pat. The Wiley-Blackwell Encyclopedia of Eighteenth-Century Writers and Writing, 1660-1789. Wiley-Blackwell, 2011.
 Watson, George. The New Cambridge Bibliography of English Literature: Volume 2, 1660-1800. Cambridge University Press, 1971.

1767 plays
British plays
Tragedy plays
West End plays
Plays based on real people
Plays set in the 13th century
Cultural depictions of countesses
Plays set in England
Plays based on novels